Malcolm Clarke is an English documentary film maker. He began his career at the BBC, directing everything from the nightly news and documentaries, to game shows and music programming. He is now working for ARTeFACT Entertainment, a media company located in Shanghai, China, founded by Chinese producer Han Yi.

Background
He left the BBC in 1975 and worked for Granada TV, Thames TV, and London Weekend TV.

During his time at Granada TV, he worked on So It Goes, a music live performance and interview show at the time where he got to work on The Sex Pistols’ first live performance in 1976. He also directed performances by XTC, Siouxsie and the Banshees, and Dave Edmunds.  He subsequently joined the network’s ‘World in Action’ unit, assigned to investigate the death of the South African political activist Stephen Biko.

He co-produced (with Michael Ryan) and directed the television documentary The Life and Death of Steve Biko in 1978, which aired on Granada TV. The film was shot entirely in secret in South Africa, and brought Clarke's work to a wider audience. The Monte Carlo Film Festival awarded the film its Grand Prize, making Biko's murder a ’cause celebre’ around the world.

After winning the award, Clarke was invited to New York to produce and direct films for the ABC's ‘Close-Up’ Documentary Unit. On October 30, 1978, Terror in The Promised Land was aired on ABC’s Close-Up. It chronicled the recruitment & operations of a Palestinian suicide squad. Shot throughout Europe, North Africa & the Middle East, the documentary was heavily boycotted when it was first aired on Network TV due to its graphic depiction of the tragic endgame of a terrorist operation and for its sympathy to the Palestinians. It was the first broadcast that ran on ABC without any commercial advertisements, only playing government PSA's during its breaks due to its controversial nature. The film was later nominated for a News & Documentary Emmy Award for directing.

In 1979, Malcolm Clarke co-wrote an ABC News TV special with author Ray Bradbury titled Infinite Horizons: Space Beyond Apollo. Bradbury additionally hosted the special, while Clarke produced and directed. The documentary celebrates the 10th anniversary of America's landing on the moon and probes the future of the human race's relationship with space. The pair won a News and Documentary Emmy Award for the film's writing in April 1981.

Another TV special he directed for ABC News’ Close-up, Soldiers of the Twilight, premiered in March 1981. The project, about guerilla mercenaries, went on to receive two nominations at the 1982 News & Documentary Emmy Awards, losing the nominating for Best Documentary Script but winning the award for Best Director. Over the course of his career, Clarke has made films in more than eighty countries and was frequently assigned to portray volatile people in extreme situations. Torturers, Serial Killers, Vigilantes, Mercenaries, Mobsters and the Yakuza were the focus of Clarke's later documentary films.

In 1985, he directed a film broadcast on HBO called Soldiers in Hiding, a portrait of Vietnam veterans who return home and are unable to cope and live in the American wilderness was nominated for an Academy Award for Best Documentary (Feature) in 1986. Although the film was nominated, Clarke himself was not, since only the producers of documentaries received nominations in the category at the time.

His first Oscar win came in 1989 at the 61st Academy Awards for You Don't Have to Die that won the  Academy Award for Best Documentary (Short Subject) category. Sharing the award with producer Bill Guttentag, The film was about a child battling cancer who inspired other youngsters with the disease.

He was then again nominated in 2003 for his film Prisoner of Paradise in the Academy Award for Best Documentary Feature category. The documentary is about holocaust victim Kurt Gerron, a celebrated German/Jewish Film Director & Actor who, while imprisoned in the Theresienstadt Concentration Camp was ordered to make a propaganda film to show the world how ‘well’ the Jews of Europe were being treated by their Nazi captors. Clarke was one of the filmmakers invited on stage by Michael Moore before he went on his famous rant about George W. Bush in his acceptance speech for Bowling for Columbine. It later won the Grierson Awards’ Gold Kodak prize for Best Filmed Documentary.
 
In March 2014 Clarke received his second Academy Award for Best Documentary (Short Subject) for the 2013 film The Lady in Number 6. He shared the award with Nicholas Reed, who also hails from England but now lives in Los Angeles. The 38-minute film tells the story of Alice Herz-Sommer, whose devotion to music and her son helped her survive two years in a Nazi prison camp. She was believed to be the oldest Holocaust survivor before her death in late February 2014 at the age of 110.

His movie, Heart of a Tiger was released in August 2015.

Work in China 
In 2018 he released the documentary he directed entitled Better Angels. The subject of the movie is about the future of US-China relations, told through talking head interviews of business leaders and politicians from both countries, intermixed with portraits of everyday people in both countries. Clarke had mentioned that he started working on the project in 2013, with them choosing to reshoot and recut the film in 2016 after Donald Trump was elected.

In 2020, Clarke and his team were granted exclusive access to Wuhan during the early phase of the COVID-19 pandemic, which resulted in a documentary titled Wuhan – A Season In Hell. In 2021, he was featured in the first episode of a series of promotional short films titled Shanghai Through Our Eyes produced by the government of Shanghai in collaboration with Xinmin Evening News to mark the 100th anniversary of the founding of the Chinese Communist Party.

References

External links

Living people
Directors of Best Documentary Short Subject Academy Award winners
British film directors
British film producers
1952 births